Christian Kreienbühl (born 6 June 1981) is a Swiss long distance runner who specialises in the marathon. He competed in the men's marathon event at the 2016 Summer Olympics. In 2018, he competed in the men's marathon at the 2018 European Athletics Championships held in Berlin, Germany. He finished in 27th place.

References

External links
 

1981 births
Living people
Swiss male long-distance runners
Swiss male marathon runners
Place of birth missing (living people)
Athletes (track and field) at the 2016 Summer Olympics
Olympic athletes of Switzerland